Geovane Diniz Silva or simply Geovane Maranhão (born 4 February 1989 in Barreirinhas), is a Brazilian footballer who plays as a striker for Al Hilal EC.

Career
Ahead of the 2019-20 season, Maranhão joined Burgan SC from fellow Kuwaiti club Al Hilal Club.

Career statistics

Honours
 Vasco da Gama
 Campeonato Brasileiro Série B: 2009

Resende
 Copa Rio: 2015

With: Al-Hilal Club
Sudan Premier League
Champion: (1) 2018

References

1966 births
Living people
Sportspeople from Maranhão
Brazilian footballers
Brazilian expatriate footballers
Association football forwards
Campeonato Brasileiro Série B players
Campeonato Brasileiro Série C players
Campeonato Brasileiro Série D players
Liga Portugal 2 players
Marília Atlético Clube players
Artsul Futebol Clube players
CR Vasco da Gama players
Duque de Caxias Futebol Clube players
C.F. Os Belenenses players
Resende Futebol Clube players
Madureira Esporte Clube players
Botafogo de Futebol e Regatas players
Associação Atlética Portuguesa (RJ) players
Al-Hilal Club (Omdurman) players
Brazilian expatriate sportspeople in Portugal
Expatriate footballers in Portugal
Brazilian expatriate sportspeople in Kuwait
Expatriate footballers in Kuwait
Burgan SC players